Proserpinus juanita, the Juanita sphinx, is a moth of the family Sphingidae first described by Herman Strecker in 1877. It is found from the US states of Montana and North Dakota, south to Arizona, and east to Missouri and Texas.

Description 
The wingspan is 45–64 mm.

Biology 

The larvae feed on Onagraceae species, including Oenothera, Gaura and Epilobium species

References

External links

Proserpinus
Moths described in 1877
Moths of North America
Taxa named by Herman Strecker